Milvago is a genus of bird of prey in the family Falconidae.

Species
Milvago contains two extant species:

They are native to South America and Trinidad and Tobago in the Caribbean,  with M. chimachima just reaching to the Isthmus of Panama and into Costa Rica, though recently having expanded its range into the northern part of the country. Prehistorically the genus extended much further north into Cuba and Hispaniola, where it might have become extinct as late as after the arrival of the first humans in the early Holocene, though there is no evidence for this at present and they more likely disappeared already during the last glacial period.

Fossil species
 †Milvago brodkorbi (Late Pleistocene of Peru)
 †Milvago alexandri (Late Pleistocene of Hispaniola, West Indies)
 †Milvago carbo, Cuban caracara (Holocene of Cuba, West Indies)
†Milvago diazfrancoi (Late Pleistocene of Cuba)

A paleosubspecies of the yellow-headed caracara from Florida is also known.

References

 
Bird genera
Taxonomy articles created by Polbot